Pin-Bot (styled PIN•BOT) is a pinball machine released by Williams in October 1986. It was designed by Python Anghelo and Barry Oursler.

Rules
The main objective of Pin-Bot is to advance through the planets of the Solar System, starting at Pluto and reaching the Sun.  The player advances from planet to planet by hitting specially marked targets, earning special bonuses throughout the game.

Pin-Bot's main feature is a grid of lights in the center of the playfield, just below the Pin•Bot.  The player can fill this grid by hitting the targets above and to the right of it.  Once completed, the visor opens, enabling the player to lock two balls in the robot's eye sockets, starting a two-ball multiball mode.  The player can then re-lock one of the balls and use the other to score a Solar Value (jackpot) up the left ramp, at which point both balls go back into play.  Each shot up the left ramp increases the Solar Value until it is collected, and this jackpot is carried over between games.

The game's playfield also features a spiral ramp, which serves as a skill shot from the plunger, and a bagatelle-style mini-playfield at the Solar Ramp exit, which can feed the ball to the right inlane, the plunger, the pop bumpers, or directly back onto the playfield.

Sequels
Pin-Bot was followed by two sequels: The Machine: Bride of Pin-Bot (released in 1991) and Jack-Bot (released in 1995).

Game quotes
 "I am in your control."
 "Partial link-up."
 "Now I see you."
 "Shoot for solar value."
 "Energy transferred."
 "We control the universe."

In popular culture
The Pin-Bot character appears in the 1988 Taxi pinball machine (created by Python Anghelo and Mark Ritchie).
A Pin-Bot machine appears in the 1988 film, Crocodile Dundee II.
A Pin-Bot machine appears in the 1988 film, Big.
A Pin-Bot machine appears in the 2002 film, Big Fat Liar.
Several Pin-Bot machines (labeled as Rik*Dat) appear as throwable weapons in the third stage of the arcade version of The Combatribes.

Digital versions
An enhanced simulation was released for the original 8-bit Nintendo Entertainment System in 1990 with very reduced graphics and sound effects due to the processing and gaming power of the system. Pin Bot was also included with more enhanced graphics in the arcade game UltraPin.

Pin-Bot was available with more realistic graphics as a licensed table of The Pinball Arcade for several platforms along with The Machine: Bride of Pin-Bot and Jack-Bot (the successors). None of these three tables are available due to WMS license expiration on June 30, 2018.

Pin*Bot is included in the Pinball Hall of Fame: The Williams Collection.

References

External links
IPDB listing for Pin-Bot

1986 pinball machines
Williams pinball machines